The Rebound is a 2009 American romantic comedy film written and directed by Bart Freundlich, starring Catherine Zeta-Jones and Justin Bartha. It was released in theaters in several countries in late 2009. It was originally scheduled to be released in the United States on 25 December 2010, but was cancelled due to the film's distributor shutting down. It ended up going direct-to-DVD in the United States on 7 February 2012.

Plot
A housewife and mother of two, Sandy (Catherine Zeta-Jones), discovers that her husband has been unfaithful. After a hasty divorce, she moves to New York City with her young son and daughter. There, they begin a new life. 

Sandy rents an apartment above a coffee house and befriends one of the baristas, Aram Finklestein (Justin Bartha). At age 25, Aram is not sure what he wants to do with his life having just separated (his wife was a French woman who married him for a green card). Despite having a college degree, he is aimless and gets a job at a women's center. 

During a self-defense class at the women's center where Aram plays the perpetrator, Sandy unleashes an "ocean of anger" on him. The next day, she goes to the coffeeshop to apologize to him and asks him to babysit her kids. He becomes a full-time nanny for the family and develops a close-knit relationship with the children; and a chemistry starts to brew between Aram and Sandy, ensuing in an awkward sexual encounter that the children come to know about.

Notwithstanding, they start to date; and, after two months, they seem perfect together. One day, Sandy feels nauseated and suspects she is pregnant. Aram is thrilled and looks forward to raising a child with her. A doctor confirms that Sandy is pregnant, but it is an ectopic pregnancy and will result in a miscarriage. 

As they leave the doctor, a fight breaks out between Aram and Sandy, with the latter confirming that she thinks it's ludicrous that the two of them, with an age difference of 15 years, would ever be happy together. After the break up, Aram decides to travel the world and to experience new things. Sandy is promoted at her sports news job to anchor.

After five years, the two meet again in a chance encounter at a Chinese restaurant. Aram reveals he has adopted a young boy from Bangladesh and is still single. Sandy, who is celebrating another promotion with her children and a colleague, invites Aram and his family to join them. 

The film ends as the two hold hands underneath the table whilst their children start to bond implying that they went on to rekindle their relationship.

Cast

 Catherine Zeta-Jones as Sandy
 Justin Bartha as Aram Finklestein
 Kelly Gould as Sadie
 Art Garfunkel as Harry Finklestein
 John Schneider (cameo) as Trevor
 Marcel Simoneau as Henri
 Joanna Gleason as Roberta Finklestein
 Steve Antonucci as Waiter, Aram's Friend
 Lynn Whitfield as Laura
 Stéphanie Szostak as Alice
 Rob Kerkovich as Mitch
 Alice Playten as Sensei Dana
 Sam Robards as Frank
 Andrew Cherry as Frank Jr., age 7
 Jake Cherry as Frank Jr., age 13 (uncredited)
 Skai Jackson as Museum Little Girl No. 1
 Saadet Aksoy as Turkish girl in cafe
 Michael Chernus as Actor No. 3

This was Alice Playten's last role before her death in 2011.

Reception

Critical response
The Rebound received generally negative reviews from film critics. Review aggregation website Rotten Tomatoes gives the film a score of 42% based on reviews from 24 critics, with 10 positive reviews and 14 negative.

Jon Frosch, said: "Saddling two game actors with a tone-deaf, charmless script, the film makes recent J.Lo vehicle The Back-up Plan look like Billy Wilder in comparison." Alex Zane said: "These are characters who seem very real. It's their imperfections, not contrived plot points, that drive the story."

Box office
The film grossed $21,790,414 worldwide.

References

External links
 

2009 films
2009 romantic comedy films
American romantic comedy films
Films directed by Bart Freundlich
Films set in Istanbul
Films set in New York City
Films shot in Paris
Films shot in Turkey
Films scored by Clint Mansell
2000s English-language films
2000s American films